

498001–498100 

|-bgcolor=#f2f2f2
| colspan=4 align=center | 
|}

498101–498200 

|-bgcolor=#f2f2f2
| colspan=4 align=center | 
|}

498201–498300 

|-bgcolor=#f2f2f2
| colspan=4 align=center | 
|}

498301–498400 

|-bgcolor=#f2f2f2
| colspan=4 align=center | 
|}

498401–498500 

|-bgcolor=#f2f2f2
| colspan=4 align=center | 
|}

498501–498600 

|-bgcolor=#f2f2f2
| colspan=4 align=center | 
|}

498601–498700 

|-bgcolor=#f2f2f2
| colspan=4 align=center | 
|}

498701–498800 

|-id=797
| 498797 Linshiawshin ||  || Lin Shiaw-shin (1944–2015) was the founder of Taiwan Science Monthly magazine. || 
|}

498801–498900 

|-bgcolor=#f2f2f2
| colspan=4 align=center | 
|}

498901–499000 

|-bgcolor=#f2f2f2
| colspan=4 align=center | 
|}

References 

498001-499000